Discovery Channel (MENA) is the Arabian version of the Discovery Channel, using a "factual entertainment" concept similar to the original American channel.

Discovery Channel (MENA) was originally available via Showtime Arabia. Then, it moved to the Orbit Network platform. Currently, the channel is available on OSN and beIN.

Programming

 The Marilyn Denis Show
 MythBusters
 How Do They Do It?
 How It's Made
 True Crime Scene
 American Chopper
 Forensic Factor
 Final 24
 Mission Implausible
 American Hot Rod
 Smash Lab
 China's Man Made Marvels
 Man Made Marvels China
 Wheeler Dealers
 Campervan Crisis
 Really Big Things
 Brainiac
 Beetle Crisis
 Dirty Jobs
 Overhaulin
 Wreck Rescue
 Fifth Gear
 Deadliest Catch
 Building the Future
 Discovery Project Earth
 Kings of Nitro
 Ultimate Survival
 Survivorman
 Ross Kemp in Afghanistan

References

External links
 Official Site

MENA
Television channels and stations established in 1996
Television channel articles with incorrect naming style
Warner Bros. Discovery EMEA